Königshain-Wiederau is a municipality in the district of Mittelsachsen, in Saxony, Germany.

One area, Wiederau, is the birthplace of Clara Zetkin.

References 

Mittelsachsen